Martina Batini (born 17 April 1989) is an Italian right-handed foil fencer, two-time team European champion, three-time team world champion, and 2021 team Olympic bronze medalist.

Career
Batini first competed both in foil and épée as a child, then specialized in foil. She won in 2006 the gold medal both in the Cadets Italian National Championships and the Cadets World Championships at Taebaek City. In 2008, she became Junior European Champion at Amsterdam. The year after, she won the U23 European Championship in Debrecen and took the third place at the Junior World Championships in Belfast.

Amongst seniors, she made her breakthrough during the 2013–14 season. She took her first World Cup with a gold medal in Tauberbischofsheim after defeating reigning World champion Arianna Errigo and reigning Olympic champion Elisa Di Francisca. A week later she won the National Italian Championships in Acireale. She also took a bronze medal at the SK Trophée in Seoul. In the 2014 European Championships in Strasbourg, she met Di Francisca in the final. Batini took a 5–1 lead, but Di Francisca scored 14 hits in a row, dooming Batini to the silver medal. In the team event, the “Dream Team” formed by Di Francisca, Errigo, Valentina Vezzali and Batini were largely given favourites, having won gold in every World Cup of the season. They cruised to the final and met Russia, who kept them at bay for the first six relays. In her last leg, Batini prevailed 7–4, giving Italy the lead for the first time in the match. A 10-hit rally by Di Francisca in the last bout allowed Italy to retain the European title.

Batini obtained in 2014 a master's degree in engineering management from the University of Pisa. Her sister Camilla is an épée fencer.

Medal Record

Olympic Games

World Championship

European Championship

Grand Prix

World Cup

References

External links
Profile at the European Fencing Confederation

Italian foil fencers
Italian female fencers
Universiade medalists in fencing
Living people
Sportspeople from Pisa
1989 births
Universiade gold medalists for Italy
World Fencing Championships medalists
Medalists at the 2009 Summer Universiade
Medalists at the 2013 Summer Universiade
Fencers at the 2020 Summer Olympics
Olympic fencers of Italy
Medalists at the 2020 Summer Olympics
Olympic bronze medalists for Italy
Olympic medalists in fencing
Mediterranean Games competitors for Italy
Competitors at the 2022 Mediterranean Games